The Aravindalochanar Perumal Temple in Tholavillimangalam, a village in Thoothukudi district in the South Indian state of Tamil Nadu, is dedicated to the Hindu god Vishnu. It is located 22 km from Tirunelveli. Constructed in the Dravidian style of architecture, the temple is glorified in the Nalayira Divya Prabandham, the early medieval Tamil canon of the Alvar saints from the 6th–9th centuries CE. It is one of the 108 Divya Desams dedicated to Vishnu, who is worshipped as Aravindalochanar and his consort Lakshmi as Karunthadankanni. The temple is also classified as a Navatirupathi, the nine temples revered by Nammalvar located in the banks of Tamiraparani river. Along with the Devapiran temple located 100 yards away, the temple is referred as Irattai Tirupati (meaning twin Tirupatis). This temple is associated with the mythological Rahu, and is called a 'Rahu Sthalam.' 

A granite wall surrounds the temple, enclosing the main shrine and pillared halls. Unlike other South Indian temples, the temple does not have a rajagopuram, the temple's gateway tower and has a flat gateway. The Vijayanagara and Nayak kings commissioned pillared halls and major shrines of the temple during the 16th century.

The temple follows the Tenkalai tradition of worship. Four daily rituals and three yearly festivals are held at the temple, of which the ten-day annual Vaikuntha Ekadashi during the Tamil month of Margaḻi (December - January) and the Nammalvar birth celebrations with Garudasevai with all nine temple of Nava Tirupati, being the most prominent. In modern times, the temple is maintained and administered by the Hindu Religious and Endowment Board of the Government of Tamil Nadu.

Legend
The temple shares the legend of its twin temple, Devapiran temple. As per Hindu legend, the place finds mention in Brahmanda Purana and Padma Purana where it is called Kedara Nilaya. Once a sage named Suprabha wanted to perform penance and in his search for land, he ploughed at this place. He found a balance (tola) and a bow (vil), which, when he lifted, turned into a couple. The couple were cursed by Kubera once for insulting them. Since the bow and balance were redeemed to their original form, the place is called Tolavillimangalam. The sage Suprabha continued to perform penance, at the end of which, the devas received the share of offering (Havibhaga). Vishnu was pleased by the devotion of the sage and since he appeared with devas, he came to be known as Devapiram.

The sage continued to perform penance at this temple and while walking down the river with lotus pond, he found Vishnu following him. At the request of the sage, Vishnu resided in this place as Aravindalochanar (the one who appeared from lotuses). As per another legend, the Ashwin twins wanted the share of the offerings made by men. They prayed to Brahma who redirected them to pray at this place. The twins came to the place and performed penance at this place. They had a dip in the tank, which came to be known as Ashvini Tirtha. Vishnu appeared to them bearing lotus flowers in his had and granted their wishes.

Architecture

The exact history of the temple is not known, but it is understood from the neighbouring inscriptions, the temple has been a part of a series of temples built by Pandyas and expanded by Madurai Nayaks. The rajagopuram, the temple's gateway tower, is a flat structure, unlike other South Indian temples, which have a conical elevated structure. A granite wall surrounds the temple, enclosing all its shrines and halls. The sanctum houses the image of Aravindalocha facing east. The image is made of shaligrama stone. The hall preceding the sanctum, the Artha Mandapam houses the festival image of Aravindalocahanar with the images of Sridevi and Bhudevi on either of his sides. The Mahamandapa has shrines for Senai Mudaliyar, Garuda, Venugopala, Manavalamamunigal, and the Alvars.

Religious significance

Brahmanda Purana one of the eighteen sacred texts of Hinduism and written by Veda Vyasa contains a chapter called Navathirupathi Mahatmeeyam that describes all the nine temples of Nava Tirupati. Aravindalochanar temple is revered in Nalayira Divya Prabandham, the 7th–9th century Vaishnava canon, by Nammalvar. The temple is classified as a Divya Desam, one of the 108 Vishnu temples that are mentioned in the book. The temple is also classified as a Navatirupathi, the nine temples revered by Nammalvar located in the banks of Tamiraparani river. Nammalvar makes a reference about the temple in his works in the Tiruvaymoli. During the 18th and 19th centuries, the temple finds mention in several works like 108 Tirupathi Anthathi by Divya Kavi Pillai Perumal Aiyangar. The temple also forms a series of Navagraha temples where each of the nine planetary deities is associated with one of the temples of Nava Tirupati.

Festival
The Garuda Sevai utsavam (festival) in the month of Vaikasi (May-June) witnesses nine Garudasevai, a large event in which festive images from the Nava Tirupati shrines in the area are brought on Garuda vahana (sacred vehicle) to Alwarthirunagari Temple. An idol of Nammalvar is also brought on an Anna Vahanam (palanquin) and his pasurams (verses) dedicated to each of these 9 temples are recited. The utsavar (festival deity) of Nammalvar is taken in a palanquin to each of the nine temples, through the paddy fields in the area. The pasurams (poems) dedicated to each of the nine Divya Desams are chanted in the respective shrines. This is the most important of the festivals in this area, and it draws thousands of visitors.

The temple follows the traditions of the Tenkalai sect of the Sri Vaishnava tradition and follows Pancharathra aagama. The temple priests perform the puja (rituals) during festivals and on a daily basis. There are weekly, monthly and fortnightly rituals and festivals performed in the temple.

See also
 Nava Tirupati
 Devapiran temple
 Irattai Thiruppathy

References

External links
 Thoothukudi District administration - Navatirupathi

 
Hindu temples in Thoothukudi district